Corumbataia tocantinensis is a species of armored catfish endemic to Brazil, where it is found in the Araguaia and Tocantins River basins.  This species grows to a length of  SL.

References
 

Otothyrinae
Fish of South America
Fish of Brazil
Endemic fauna of Brazil
Taxa named by Heraldo Antonio Britski
Fish described in 1997